Peter Donahue or Donohue is the name of:

 Peter Donahue (businessman) (died 1885), founder of industrial San Francisco
 Peter M. Donohue, Roman Catholic priest and president of Villanova University
 Pete Donohue (1900–1988), baseball pitcher

See also
 Peter O'Donohue (1923–2012), Australian rules footballer
 Peter Donohoe (disambiguation)